Vorona (Malagasy for "bird", V. berivotrensis, "from Berivotra") is a monotypic genus of prehistoric birds. It was described from fossils found in a Maevarano Formation quarry near the village of Berivotra, Mahajanga Province, Madagascar. The age of the fossilised specimen is Late Cretaceous, probably Maastrichtian (72.1-66.0 mya). V. berivotrensis is known from scattered remains, possibly from a single individual (UA 8651 and FMNH PA715).

The phylogenic affinity of Vorona is hard to determine due to the fragmentary nature of the remains, mainly because the fossil shows a mix of basal avian features as well as some that seem very derived. Vorona might be a primitive ornithuromorph. At least two studies recovered it as part of Enantiornithes, however.

Vorona is sometimes confused with the  dromaeosaur Rahonavis ostromi, a fossil of which was found in the same location. This confusion has led to the common misconception that Vorona had a deinonychosaur-like sickle claw on each foot.

References

Further reading

Bird genera
Cretaceous birds of Africa
Maevarano fauna
Maastrichtian life
Prehistoric euornitheans